The Upemba mud turtle (Pelusios upembae) is a species of turtle in the family Pelomedusidae.

It is endemic to Democratic Republic of the Congo.

References

 Tortoise & Freshwater Turtle Specialist Group 1996.  Pelusios upembae.   2006 IUCN Red List of Threatened Species.   Downloaded on 29 July 2007.

Upemba mud turtle
Endemic fauna of the Democratic Republic of the Congo
Reptiles of the Democratic Republic of the Congo
Upemba mud turtle
Taxonomy articles created by Polbot